Cephalonomancy (also known as cephaleonomancy or kephalonomancy) is an ancient form of divination which used two different methods; one was concerned with the shape of the skull, somewhat like extispicy or phrenology the other  involved heating the skull of a donkey or goat while reciting various phrases, often the names of criminal suspects.  If the skull crackled or the jaw moved while a name was spoken, this was taken to identify the guilty party.

References

External links
Mantalogue

Divination